Impound race may refer to one of the following:

 Impound race (NASCAR) - rules for NASCAR versions of impound races.
 Impound race - terminology definition in Glossary of motorsport terms.
 Parc fermé - terminology definition in Glossary of motorsport term.
 Parc fermé French term for FIA race rules.